Ocean Chief may refer to:

Ships
 Ocean Chief (clipper), a clipper ship at the time of the Australian gold rushes 1854–1861
 , ordered as SS Ocean Chief in 1944
 Ocean Chief, a shipwreck in May 1875 in Fintry Bay, Argyllshire, Scotland

Other uses
 Ocean Chief, a Swedish band associated with The Funeral Orchestra
 Ocean Chief, in whale worship, a name for whales in many Chinese cultures